Happy Christmas is a 1998 holiday music compilation album released by BEC Records featuring artists from a variety of styles who were signed to BEC and its parent label, Tooth & Nail Records, and its parent EMI Christian Music. While most songs are classic Christmas songs, some are original tunes. The album is the first in what would later become a series of releases.

Track listing

References

1998 Christmas albums
Christmas albums by American artists
Happy Christmas albums
Record label compilation albums
1998 compilation albums